The 1995 SANFL season was the 116th season of the highest level Australian rules football competition in South Australia.

Ladder

Finals Series

Grand Final

References 

SAnFL
South Australian National Football League seasons